Agent Wild Duck is a 2002  Estonian action film directed and written by Marko Raat with Andres Maimik. The film premiered on 19 September 2002 in Tallinn and starred Mait Malmsten.

Cast 

 Mait Malmsten as Hans
 Kersti Heinloo as Monika
 Florian Feigl as Florian
 Andrus Vaarik as Raul
 Kaido Veermäe as Solicitor
 Mihkel Smeljanski as Mine's director
 Aleksander Eelmaa as AÜ chairman
 Toomas Suuman as Land-jobber
 Sten Zupping as Land-jobber
 Viire Valdma as Barmaid
 Enn Klooren as Konfident Kapital employee
 Tiit Lilleorg as Konfident Kapital employee
 Tiit Ojasoo as Konfident Kapital employee
 Meelis Salujärv as Konfident Kapital employee

References

External links 
 

Estonian action films
2002 films
Estonian-language films
2000s spy action films